Severe Tropical Storm Nanmadol, known in the Philippines as Severe Tropical Storm Emong, was a tropical cyclone that impacted southern Japan during July 2017. Nanmadol developed over in the Philippine Sea as a tropical depression on July 1, and strengthened into the third named storm of the 2017 typhoon season on July 3. On July 4, Nanmadol turned eastwards and made landfall near Nagasaki, Kyushu, just before it transitioned into an extratropical cyclone.

Nanmadol dropped torrential rainfall across Kyushu, resulting in landslides, although the Fukuoka and Ōita Prefectures were the hardest hit. The city of Asakura, Fukuoka experienced a one-day rainfall surpassing the city's average total for July by 50%, with a rainfall of  recorded within a 12-hour period on July 5. Landslides were recorded in 44 different locations and flooding in 38 locations, and from this, more than 2,600 homes were destroyed. In total, 42 people died from Nanmadol due to drowning from flash flooding or due to landslides. Total damages was estimated to have toppled to ¥190 billion (US$1.68 billion).

Meteorological history

Noting some organization within the system, the Joint Typhoon Warning Center (JTWC) issued a Tropical Cyclone Formation Alert (TCFA) early on July 1. Six hours later, the Japan Meteorological Agency (JMA) classified it as a tropical depression. Later that day, the JMA began to issue advisories, predicting that the system could intensify into a tropical storm within the next 24 hours. Shortly after, the Philippine Atmospheric, Geophysical and Astronomical Services Administration (PAGASA) upgraded the system to a tropical depression, assigning the local name Emong.

Early on July 2, the JMA upgraded the system to a tropical storm, and assigned the official name Nanmadol. The PAGASA also upgraded the system to a tropical storm. Soon after, the JTWC gave the system the internal designation of 05W. Satellite imagery depicted convective banding wrapping tightly into Nanmadol's low-level circulation center (LLCC), prompting the JTWC to upgrade it to a tropical storm in their next advisory. At this time, the JMA stated that Nanmadol had intensified into a severe tropical storm. The PAGASA also upgraded Nanmadol to a severe tropical storm in their final advisory on the system as it exited the Philippine Area of Responsibility.

Nanmadol continued to intensify while moving northward just to the east of Taiwan, with satellite imagery capturing a small, developing eye. However, the JTWC assessed that Nanmadol reached its peak intensity as a Category 1-equivalent typhoon with 1-minute sustained winds of  six hours later in a post-analysis report. Nanmadol maintained its peak intensity for several hours until just before July 4, when the system began curving eastwards and its satellite presentation deteriorated. Despite the system still displaying a well-defined center, cloud tops began to warm, in line with the rapid weakening trend of the system. After several hours, Nanmadol began to interact with the mid-latitude westerlies; the JTWC downgraded the system further to a low-end of tropical storm intensity, though the JMA still maintained it at severe tropical storm intensity. By 21:00 UTC on the same day, the JTWC issued its final advisory on Nanmadol, mentioning that the system was embedded within the cold baroclinic zone, and had thus lost its tropical characteristics and transitioned into a cold-core low. The JMA soon followed suit with their final warning, declaring that Nanmadol had fully become an extratropical cyclone at 00:00 UTC on July 5. Its extratropical remnants later left the basin on July 8.

Preparations, impact, and aftermath

The JMA issued a heavy rain warning for Shimane Prefecture and neighboring areas, in which the government had urged 20,000 residents to evacuate. On July 3, the Sasebo City Emergency Management Bureau activated a total of 30 emergency shelters. The government dispatched a total of 12,000 rescuers, including police officers, firefighters and the Self-Defense Forces troops, in preparation for post-storm relief. On July 10, the Kyushu Railway Company began a bus service to aid residents trapped in some areas along the currently suspended Kyudai Main Line; this included areas between Ukiha Station in Fukuoka Prefecture and Hita Station, Ōita Prefecture, where an iron bridge spanning a river was washed away by floodwaters. Due to the threat of further landslides, the West Nippon Expressway Company extended a closure of the Ōita Expressway. Therefore, on July 11, Forestry Minister Yuji Yamamoto pledged to set up a task force to remove driftwood. Meanwhile, an official at the University of Hyogo warned other municipalities of potential damage caused by fallen trees.

Strong winds overturned vehicles, collapsed scaffolding, and left 68,500 homes without power in Nagasaki and Kumamoto prefectures; other blackouts occurred in the prefectures of Ōita, Miyazaki and Kagoshima. Around 3,000 airline passengers were affected by the grounding and cancellation of at least 47 flights. Heavy rains and strong winds disrupted numerous train services including the iconic Shinkansen, between Hakata and Kagoshima-Chuo in Kyushu. In Hamada, Shimane, over  fell in an hour.

At least three people were injured during the storm—a young boy's hand was injured when a school window broke in the city of Kumamoto, and two adults in Ōita prefecture sustained injuries from falls as a result of the strong winds. About 180 people took shelter at a junior high school gymnasium in Asakura. Due to the risk of landslides, an evacuation order which covered 316 people from 115 households was issued in the Haki District of Asakura, due to high risk of landslides. Throughout the Fukuoka and Ōita Prefectures, 1,724 people evacuated. More than 2,600 homes were destroyed by Nanmadol around the Fukuoka, Oita, and the Hiroshima prefectures, but a later report showed a total of 4,458 buildings damaged. Nearly a week after the flooding had begun, some roads were already reopened over in some communities in the Fukuoka Prefecture. During July 12, the Japanese Prime Minister Shinzō Abe canceled a trip to Estonia for a European tour and instead visited devastated places over in the Kyushu region to view the damage and console residents. He also promised that the government would take action and do everything possible to help rebuild.

A total of 42 people have been confirmed dead due to torrential rains which caused landslides and flooding, particularly in Kyushu, where two still remained missing and leaving 39 people injured.  Total damages in Japan were amounted to be ¥190 billion (US$1.68 billion).

See also

Other tropical cyclones named Nanmadol
Other tropical cyclones named Emong
Typhoon Neoguri (2014)
Typhoon Chaba (2016)
Tropical Storm Etau (2009)
Tropical Storm Etau (2015)
Typhoon Talim (2017)

References

External links

JMA General Information of Severe Tropical Storm Nanmadol (1703) from Digital Typhoon
JMA Best Track Data of Severe Tropical Storm Nanmadol (1703) 
05W.NANMADOL from the U.S. Naval Research Laboratory

2017 Pacific typhoon season
Articles containing video clips
July 2017 events in Japan
Typhoons in Japan
Nanmadol